D. R. MacDonald is the pen name of David R. MacDonald, a Canadian-American writer who publishes novels and short stories. Born on Boularderie Island, Nova Scotia and raised in Ohio, he is a professor emeritus of creative writing at Stanford University. He still spend summers at the family homestead in Cape Breton Island, which he purchased in 1971, and his fiction is set in Cape Breton.

His novel Lauchlin of the Bad Heart was a longlisted nominee for the Scotiabank Giller Prize in 2007.

Works
 Eyestone (1988, short stories)
 Cape Breton Road (2001, novel)
 in German: Die Straße nach Cape Breton. Transl. Heidi Zerning. S. Fischer, Francfort 2002
 All the Men Are Sleeping (2002, short stories)
 Lauchlin of the Bad Heart (2007, novel)
 Anna From Away (2012, novel)
 The Ice Bridge (2013, novel)

References

American male novelists
Canadian male novelists
Canadian male short story writers
21st-century American novelists
21st-century Canadian novelists
Writers from Nova Scotia
Novelists from Ohio
Writers from California
Stanford University faculty
Living people
1939 births
People from Victoria County, Nova Scotia
American male short story writers
20th-century Canadian short story writers
21st-century Canadian short story writers
21st-century American short story writers
20th-century Canadian male writers
21st-century Canadian male writers
21st-century American male writers